UPAC may refer to:

Ulster Performing Arts Center, a theater in Kingston, New York
Unité permanente anticorruption, a Quebec regulatory agency
University Place Aquatic Club, a swim team in University Place, Washington
Unidad de poder adquisitivo constante, unit of constant purchasing power introduced in 1972 in Colombia (see Industry of Colombia)